Anthony Lawrence Azevedo (born November 21, 1981) is a Brazilian-born American water polo player. He is a 2008 Olympic silver medalist and a five-time Olympian (2000, 2004, 2008, 2012, 2016). Azevedo ranks fourth on the all-time scoring list in Olympic history, with 61 goals. Nicknamed "The Savior" at one point, he is considered to be one of the best American water polo players in recent memory. He was the former captain of the U.S. National Men's Water Polo Team. He is also a graduate of Stanford University.

Early life
Tony Azevedo was born in Rio de Janeiro, but his family moved to California when he was 1 month old. His mother is American and his father is the Brazilian Ricardo Azevedo, a former Olympic water polo player. When he was four, Azevedo suffered a fall that severed his trachea and esophagus. Although his heart stopped beating on the operating table for a period of four minutes before doctors were able to revive him, he made a complete recovery and went on to excel in water polo, a strenuous sport.

He is 1.85 m (6 ft) and weighs 91 kg (200 lbs).

During his four years at Wilson Classical High School in Long Beach, California, his team won four California Interscholastic Federation championships and he was named MVP all four years.

College career
Azevedo led Stanford's men's water polo team to two NCAA championships (in 2001 and 2002), and he represented the United States at the 2000 Summer Olympics in Sydney and the 2004 Summer Olympics in Athens. At the 2004 Olympics, Azevedo was second on the tournament's goals scored list with 15. He set a school freshman scoring record (68 goals), a single-season school record as a sophomore (95, or 3.4 goals a game) and, scored a school record 332 career goals in four years at Stanford. For each of his four years in college, Azevedo was honored as the most outstanding male player of the year with the Peter J. Cutino Award – water polo's version of the Heisman Trophy.  While at Stanford, he was a member of the Alpha Pi chapter of the Kappa Alpha Order.

Professional career
In 2004 after graduating from Stanford University with a degree in International Relations, Azevedo signed a professional water polo contract with Bissolati Cremona (Italy) placing him among the top 10 paid players in the sport. Playing with Team Bissolati for his third season in 2006, he scored 63 goals with a 2.62 average per game. Azevedo rejoined the rest of the US men's national team at the 2007  Melbourne World Championships.  Azevedo scored 5 goals of an 8–4 win by the US National Team over host country China in the opening games of the 2008 Summer Olympics.  In the championship game, the USA team won the silver medal, defeated by Hungary.

Azevedo played for VK Jug from Dubrovnik for two seasons from 2008 until 2010. Since summer 2010 he's been playing for VK Primorac from Kotor.

At the 2012 Summer Olympics, Azevedo was named the captain of the United States men's national water polo team. Near the end of the contest against Romania on July 31, 2012, he was called for a misconduct foul and was given a red card. The USA team defeated Romania 10–8.

In 2010s he played for Croatian water polo squad Jug from Dubrovnik.

Podcast
In 2020, he began co-hosting The Tony Azevedo Podcast with El Segundo, California stand-up comic Dave Williamson.

Personal life
The Azevedo family is a water polo dynasty. His father, Ricardo Azevedo, played on the Brazilian national water polo team and coached his son throughout his age group and high school career. Azevedo senior was Head Water Polo Coach both of the U.S. National Team and Long Beach State University. Tony's sister Cassie is a two-time All-American water polo player at Long Beach State.  Cassie also plays professionally in Italy after adjusting to a congenital health condition that temporarily sidetracked her water polo career.

See also
 List of athletes with the most appearances at Olympic Games
 List of players who have appeared in multiple men's Olympic water polo tournaments
 List of Olympic medalists in water polo (men)
 List of men's Olympic water polo tournament top goalscorers

References

External links
 
 Azevedo's official Stanford athletics biography
 Tony Azevedo biography on Mikasa Sports
 Tony Azevedo Podcast website

1981 births
Living people
Water polo players from Rio de Janeiro (city)
Brazilian emigrants to the United States
American sportspeople of Brazilian descent
American male water polo players
Water polo drivers
Water polo players at the 2000 Summer Olympics
Water polo players at the 2004 Summer Olympics
Water polo players at the 2008 Summer Olympics
Water polo players at the 2012 Summer Olympics
Water polo players at the 2016 Summer Olympics
Medalists at the 2008 Summer Olympics
Olympic silver medalists for the United States in water polo
Water polo players at the 2011 Pan American Games
Water polo players at the 2015 Pan American Games
Pan American Games gold medalists for the United States
Pan American Games medalists in water polo
Stanford Cardinal men's water polo players
American water polo coaches
Wilson Classical High School alumni
Medalists at the 2011 Pan American Games
Medalists at the 2015 Pan American Games